SNN News is a Swedish news-parody show starring Mikael Tornving as the news anchor. The show aired on TV4 October 18, 2013. Reporters are David Hellenius, Peter Magnusson, Anna Blomberg, Rachel Molin and Sissela Benn. In every report a celebrity is participating as guest-reporter.

Episodes

External links 
 
 

TV4 (Sweden) original programming
2013 Swedish television series debuts